Hensies is a municipality of Wallonia located in the province of Hainaut, Belgium. 

It has 6,857 inhabitants, as of January 1, 2017. The total area is 25.99 km², giving a population density of 258 inhabitants per km².

The municipality consists of the following districts: Hainin, Hensies, Montrœul-sur-Haine, and Thulin.

References

External links
 

Municipalities of Hainaut (province)